Madeleine Lemoyne, Mrs. Charles E. Ellicott (November 14, 1856 – 1945) was an American suffragist. She was the founder of the League of Women Voters of Maryland, serving as its president for 20 years, longer than anyone else.

Life 
Born in Chicago, Ellicott studied chemistry at Rush Medical College, and then continued her studies at the Polytechnic in Zurich, Switzerland. In conjunction with the annual National League of Women Voters meeting planned for Baltimore in 1922, she was one of the organizers of the Pan-American Conference of Women. 

She married Charles Ellis Ellicott in 1890. They had three sons, Charles Ellis Ellicott, Jr. (born 1892), Valcoulon Lemoyne Ellicott (born 1893), and John Roman Ellicott (born 1896).

References

1856 births
1945 deaths
American suffragists
People from Chicago
Rush Medical College alumni
ETH Zurich alumni